Ekma is a Tehsil town and Taluka of Banwari Amnour in Saran district of Bihar state, India.

See also
Eksar
Asahani

References

External links
 Satellite map of Ekma

Cities and towns in Saran district